Arthur Kelvin Barnes (6 December 1909 – 11 March 1969) was an American science fiction author.  Barnes wrote mostly for pulp magazines in the 1930s and 1940s.  Barnes was most noted for his vivid and believable portrayals of alien life.  As such, he is compared to Stanley G. Weinbaum.  Before Barnes (and Weinbaum), SF writers usually portrayed aliens as earth-like monsters, with little originality. He was a member of the Mañana Literary Society.  Several stories by Barnes were collaborations with the author Henry Kuttner, including several of the Hollywood on the Moon, Pete Manx, and Gerry Carlyle series of stories.

Barnes wrote a series of stories about "interplanetary hunters" Tommy Strike and Gerry Carlyle, collected in the books Interplanetary Hunter (1956) and Interplanetary Huntress (2007).

Bibliography

Lord of the Lightning, Wonder Stories, (December, 1931)
Green Hell (1937)
Interplanetary Hunter (1956)
Interplanetary Huntress (1956)
The Interplanetary Huntress Returns
The Interplanetary Huntress' Last Case
Hollywood on the Moon
Man about Time
Pete Manx, Time Troubler
The Dual World
Trouble on Titan

References

External links

 
 

1909 births
1969 deaths
20th-century American male writers
20th-century American novelists
20th-century American short story writers
American male short story writers
American male novelists
American science fiction writers